Gnuni (c. 300–800.) was a princely family in Armenia, who ruled the region of Aliovit, including the cities of Archesh, Arberani and Berkri on the northern shore of Lake Van. They were an offshoot of the Orontids.

Main rulers:
Atat Gnuni c. 387, deposed
Atom Gnuni c. 445
Vahan Gnuni c. 451
Atom and Arastom Gnuni c. 480
Mjej Gnuni c. 628
Vahan a.k.a. Dachnak c. 772

Around 772, Manazkert and Aghiovit were occupied by the Qayasite Dynasty.

See also
List of regions of old Armenia

References

Sources 
  

Gnuni family
Early medieval Armenian regions